The Kirker Covered Bridge, near West Union, Ohio, was built in the late 1860s.  It was listed on the National Register of Historic Places in 1975.

It is a kingpost truss bridge.

It is located southwest of West Union off State Route 136.  It is named for the Ohio governor during 1807–08, Thomas Kirker, who had immigrated from Ireland in 1779 and was the first permanent settler in the area, in 1794.

The bridge was closed to vehicular traffic.

See also
Governor Thomas Kirker Homestead, also NRHP-listed

References

Covered bridges in Ohio
National Register of Historic Places in Adams County, Ohio
Bridges completed in 1865